Ridgeline High School is a high school in Millville, Utah. It is part of Cache County School District.

History 

Ridgeline High School was dedicated on 9 August 2016 and began operations for the 2016-2017 school year. It serves the communities of Millville, Nibley, Providence, River Heights, College Ward, and Young Ward.

Athletics 

Ridgeline participates in sports sanctioned by the Utah High School Activities Association. The school's nickname is the Riverhawks. The school competes in Region 11 of class 4A. The following sports are offered

 Baseball (boys)
 Basketball (girls & boys)
 Cross Country (girls & boys)
 Football (boys)
 Golf (girls & boys)
 Lacrosse (girls & boys)
 Soccer (girls & boys)
 Softball (girls)
 Swimming (girls & boys)
 Tennis (girls & boys)
 Track & Field (girls & boys)
 Volleyball (girls)
 Wrestling (girls & boys)
 Drill Team (girls)
 Marching Band (girls & boys)

References

External links 
 

Schools in Utah
Public high schools in Utah
Schools in Cache County, Utah
2016 establishments in Utah